Division No. 8 is one of eighteen census divisions in the province of Saskatchewan, Canada, as defined by Statistics Canada. It is located in the west-southwestern part of the province, bordering Alberta. The most populous community in this division is Swift Current.

Demographics 

Census subdivisions 
The following census subdivisions (municipalities or municipal equivalents) are located within Saskatchewan's Division No. 8.

Cities
Swift Current

Towns
Burstall
Cabri
Eatonia
Elrose
Eston
Gull Lake
Kyle
Leader

Villages

Abbey
Fox Valley
Golden Prairie
Hazlet
Lancer
Mendham
Pennant
Prelate
Richmound
Sceptre
Shackleton
Stewart Valley
Success
Tompkins
Webb

Rural municipalities

 RM No. 137 Swift Current
 RM No. 138 Webb
 RM No. 139 Gull Lake
 RM No. 141 Big Stick
 RM No. 142 Enterprise
 RM No. 167 Saskatchewan Landing
 RM No. 168 Riverside
 RM No. 169 Pittville
 RM No. 171 Fox Valley
 RM No. 228 Lacadena
 RM No. 229 Miry Creek
 RM No. 230 Clinworth
 RM No. 231 Happyland
 RM No. 232 Deer Forks
 RM No. 257 Monet
 RM No. 259 Snipe Lake
 RM No. 260 Newcombe
 RM No. 261 Chesterfield

Indian reserves
 Carry the Kettle Nakoda Nation
 Carry the Kettle 76-33
 Carry the Kettle 76-37
 Carry the Kettle 76-38

Unincorporated communities

Hamlets
 Laporte

Organized hamlets

 White Bear
 Wymark

Special service areas
 Mantario

Unincorporated communities

 Abbey Colony
 Aikins
 Beverley
 Cantuar
 Chipperfield
 Cuthbert
 Duncairn
 Dunelm
 Estuary
 Eyre
 Forgan
 Gascoigne
 Glidden
 Greenan
 Gunnworth
 Hak
 High Point
 Horsham
 Hughton
 Inglebright
 Isham
 Java
 Lacadena
 Leinan
 Lemsford
 Lille
 Linacre
 Madison
 Matador
 Mondou
 Nadeauville
 Penkill
 Plato
 Player
 Portreeve
 Rhineland
 Richlea
 Roadene
 Rosengart
 Roseray
 Saltburn
 Sanctuary
 Schantzenfeld
 Schoenfeld
 Schoenwiese
 Shackleton
 Snipe Lake
 Springfeld
 Surprise
 Tuberose
 Tunstall
 Tyner
 Verlo
 Wartime
 Wheatland Colony
 Witley
 Wyatt

See also 
List of census divisions of Saskatchewan
List of communities in Saskatchewan

References

Division No. 8, Saskatchewan Statistics Canada

 
08